"I Love Her Mind" is a song written by David Bellamy, and recorded by American country music duo The Bellamy Brothers.  It was released in May 1983 as the third single from the album Strong Weakness.  The song reached number 4 on the Billboard Hot Country Singles & Tracks chart.

Chart performance

References

1983 singles
1982 songs
The Bellamy Brothers songs
Song recordings produced by Jimmy Bowen
Elektra Records singles
Curb Records singles
Songs written by David Bellamy (singer)